John Thomas Sayles (born September 28, 1950) is an American independent film director, screenwriter, editor, actor, and novelist. He has twice been nominated for the Academy Award for Best Original Screenplay, for Passion Fish (1992) and Lone Star (1996). His film Men with Guns (1997) was nominated for the Golden Globe for Best Foreign Language Film. His directorial debut, Return of the Secaucus 7 (1980), has been added to the National Film Registry.

Early life
Sayles was born on September 28, 1950, in Schenectady, New York, the son of Mary (née Rausch), a teacher, and Donald John Sayles, a school administrator. Both of Sayles's parents were Catholic and of half-Irish descent. Sayles has referred to himself as a "Catholic atheist". He attended Williams College with frequent collaborators Gordon Clapp and David Strathairn, as well as his longtime partner, Maggie Renzi. Sayles earned a B.A. in psychology in 1972.

Career

After college, Sayles moved to Boston where he worked a variety of blue-collar jobs while writing short stories for The Atlantic. These writings culminated in his first novel, The Pride of the Bimbos, published in 1975.

Like Martin Scorsese and Francis Ford Coppola, Sayles began his film career working with Roger Corman. In 1979, Sayles used $30,000 he earned writing scripts for Corman to fund his first film, Return of the Secaucus 7. To make the film on a limited budget, he set the film in a large house so that he did not have to travel to or get permits for different locations, set the story over a three-day weekend to limit costume changes, and wrote about people his age so he could cast his friends in it. The film received near-unanimous critical acclaim at the time and has held its reputation. In November 1997, the National Film Preservation Board announced that Return of the Secaucus 7 would be one of the 25 films selected that year for preservation in the National Film Registry at the Library of Congress.

In 1983, after the films Baby It's You (starring Rosanna Arquette) and Lianna (a story in which a married woman becomes discontented with her marriage and falls in love with another woman), Sayles received a MacArthur Fellowship. He put the money into the science fiction feature The Brother from Another Planet, a film about a three-toed humanoid who escapes bondage on another world and crash-lands in New York harbour; because he is Africanoid in appearance, he finds himself at home among the people of Harlem, being pursued by European-looking alien enslavers men in black.

In 1989, Sayles created and wrote the pilot episode for the short-lived television show Shannon's Deal about a down-and-out Philadelphia lawyer played by Jamey Sheridan. Sayles received a 1990 Edgar Award for his teleplay for the pilot. The show ran for 16 episodes before being cancelled in 1991.

Sayles has funded most of his films by writing genre scripts, such as Piranha, Alligator, The Howling, and The Challenge Having collaborated with Joe Dante on Piranha and The Howling, Sayles acted in Dante's movie, Matinee. Sayles gets the rest of his funding by working as a script doctor; he did rewrites for Apollo 13 and Mimic.

A genre script, called Night Skies, inspired what would eventually become the film E.T. the Extra-Terrestrial. That film's director, Steven Spielberg, later commissioned Sayles to write a script (unused) for the fourth Jurassic Park film.

He has written and directed his own films, including Lone Star, Passion Fish, Eight Men Out, The Secret of Roan Inish, and Matewan. He serves on the advisory board for the Austin Film Society.
Maggie Renzi has been John Sayles's long-time companion (and collaborator), but they have not married. Renzi has produced most of his films since Lianna. They met as students at Williams College.

Sayles works with a regular repertory of actors, most notably Chris Cooper, David Strathairn, and Gordon Clapp, each of whom has appeared in at least four of his films.

In early 2003, Sayles signed the Not In Our Name "Statement of Conscience" (along with Noam Chomsky, Steve Earle, Brian Eno, Jesse Jackson, Viggo Mortensen, Bonnie Raitt, Oliver Stone, Marisa Tomei, Susan Sarandon and others) which opposed the invasion of Iraq.

In February 2009, Sayles was reported to be writing an HBO series based on the early life of Anthony Kiedis of the Red Hot Chili Peppers. The drama, tentatively titled Scar Tissue, centers on Kiedis's early years living in West Hollywood with his father. At that time, Kiedis's father, known as Spider, sold drugs (according to legend, his clients included The Who and Led Zeppelin) and mingled with rock stars on the Sunset Strip, all while aspiring to get into show business.

In February 2010, Sayles began shooting his 17th feature film, the historical war drama Amigo, in the Philippines. The film is a fictional account of events during the Philippine–American War, with a cast that includes Joel Torre, Chris Cooper, and Garret Dillahunt.

His novel A Moment in the Sun, set during the same period as Amigo, in the Philippines, Cuba, and the U.S., was released in 2011 by McSweeney's. It includes an account of the Wilmington Insurrection of 1898 in North Carolina, the only coup d'état in United States history in which a duly elected government was overthrown.

Legacy and honors
1983 MacArthur Fellowship 
1990 Edgar Award, for teleplay for pilot of Shannon's Deal
In June 2014, Sayles donated his non-film archive to the University of Michigan. It will be accessible at the Harlan Hatcher Graduate Library. Sayles's film archive is held by the UCLA Film and Television Archive.

Filmography

Writer/director
Return of the Secaucus 7 (1980)
Lianna (1983) 
Baby It's You (1983) 
The Brother from Another Planet (1984) 
Matewan (1987) 
Eight Men Out (1988) (also actor portraying Ring Lardner)
City of Hope (1991) 
Passion Fish (1992) 
The Secret of Roan Inish (1994) 
Lone Star (1996) 
Men with Guns (1997) 
Limbo (1999) 
Sunshine State (2002) 
Casa de los Babys (2003) 
Silver City (2004) 
Honeydripper (2007) 
Amigo (2010) 
Go for Sisters (2013)

Writer (film)
Piranha (1978)
The Lady in Red (1979)
Battle Beyond the Stars (1980)
Alligator (1980)
The Howling (1981)
The Challenge (with Richard Maxwell) (1982)
E.T. the Extra Terrestrial (early draft, then titled Night Skies)
Enormous Changes at the Last Minute (with Susan Rice) (1983)
The Clan of the Cave Bear (1986)
Wild Thing (1987)
Breaking In (1989)
Men of War (as A Safe Place, later repolished by Ethan Reiff and Cyrus Voris) (1994)
Apollo 13 (1995) (uncredited rewrite)
The Spiderwick Chronicles (Co-writer with David Berenbaum and Karey Kirkpatrick) (2008)
 The Devil's Highway (2018)

Writer (TV)
A Perfect Match (with Mel Damski) (1980)
Unnatural Causes (1986)
Shannon's Deal (1989) (Creator)
The Alienist (2018)

Actor (film)
Return of the Secaucus 7 (as Howie) (1980)
Lianna (as Jerry) (1983)
The Brother from Another Planet (as Man in Black #2) (1984)
Something Wild (as Motorcycle Cop) (1986)
Matewan (as Hardshell Preacher) (1987)
Eight Men Out (as Ring Lardner) (1988)
City of Hope (as Carl) (1991)
Matinee (as Bob) (1993)
Gridlock'd (1996) 
In the Electric Mist (as Michael Goldman) (2009)
The Normals (as Dr. Marx) (2012)

Bibliography

Novels
Pride of the Bimbos (1975) (novel)
Union Dues (1977) (novel)
Los Gusanos (1991) (novel)
A Moment in the Sun (2011) (novel)
Yellow Earth (2020) (novel)

Collections and non-fiction
The Anarchists' Convention (1979) (short story collection)
Thinking in Pictures: The Making of the Movie "Matewan" (1987) (non-fiction)
Dillinger in Hollywood (2004) (short story collection)

Music videos
Bruce Springsteen – "Born in the U.S.A."
Bruce Springsteen – "I'm on Fire"
Bruce Springsteen – "Glory Days"

Awards/nominations

Films
Awards for Honeydripper:
Outstanding Independent or Foreign Film (Win) –  2008 NAACP Image Award
Outstanding Writing in a Motion Picture (Theatrical or Television) (Nominated) – John Sayles – 2008 NAACP Image Awards
Top 10 Independent Films of 2007 – National Board of Review of Motion Pictures
Best Screenplay (Win) – John Sayles – 2007 San Sebastián International Film Festival (Tied with Gracia Querejeta and David Planell for Siete mesas de billar francés (2007))

Award for Silver City:
Golden Seashell Award for Best Film (Nominated) – John Sayles – 2004 San Sebastián International Film Festival

Awards for Sunshine State:
Golden Orange Award (Win) – John Sayles – 2002 Florida Film Critics Circle Awards
Special Mention For Excellence In Filmmaking (Win) – 2002 National Board of Review

Awards for Limbo:
Best Director Golden Space Needle Award (Win) – John Sayles −1999 Seattle International Film Festival
Outstanding Indies (Win) – 1999 National Board of Review

Awards for Men with Guns/Hombres armados:
Best Foreign Independent Film (Nominated) – 1998 British Independent Film Awards
Best Foreign Film (Nominated) – 1999 Golden Globes
Peace Award (Nominated) – 1998 Political Film Society
FIPRESCI Prize (Win) – John Sayles – 1997 San Sebastián International Film Festival
OCIC Award (Win) – John Sayles – 1997 San Sebastián International Film Festival
Solidarity Award (Win) – John Sayles – 1997 San Sebastián International Film Festival
Golden Seashell Award for Best Film (Nominated) – John Sayles – 1997 San Sebastián International Film Festival

Awards for Lone Star:
Best Original Screenplay (Nominated) – John Sayles – 1997 Academy Awards
Best Original Screenplay (Nominated) – John Sayles – 1997 BAFTA Awards
Best Screenplay, Motion Picture (Nominated) – John Sayles – 1997 Golden Globes
Best Screenplay Written Directly for the Screen (Nominated) – John Sayles – 1997 Writers Guild of America Award
Best Picture (Nominated) – 1997 Broadcast Film Critics Association Awards
Best Motion Picture Original Screenplay (Win) – John Sayles – 1997 Golden Satellite Awards
Best Motion Picture – Drama (Nominated) – Maggie Renzi & R. Paul Miller – 1997 Golden Satellite Awards
Best Screenplay (Nominated) – John Sayles – 1997 Independent Spirit Awards
Best Film (Win) – Lone Star – 1996 Lone Star Film & Television Awards
Best Director (Win) – John Sayles – 1996 Lone Star Film & Television Awards
Best Screenplay (Win) – John Sayles – 1996 Lone Star Film & Television Awards
Special Achievement Award for Outstanding Feature Film (Win) – 1996 NCLR Bravo Awards
Best Director (Win) – John Sayles – 1997 Southeastern Film Critics Association Awards

Awards for The Secret of Roan Inish:
Best Genre Video Release (Nominated) – 1996 Academy of Science Fiction, Fantasy & Horror Films
International Critics Award (Win) – John Sayles – 1996 Gérardmer Film Festival
Best Director (Nominated) – John Sayles – 1996 Independent Spirit Awards
Best Screenplay (Nominated) – John Sayles – 1996 Independent Spirit Awards

Awards for Passion Fish:
Best Original Screenplay (Nominated) – John Sayles – 1993 Academy Awards
Golden Spur Award (Win) – John Sayles – 1993 Flanders International Film Festival
Best Screenplay Written Directly for the Screen (Nominated) – John Sayles – 1993 Writers Guild of America

Awards for City of Hope:
Critics Award (Nominated) – John Sayles – 1991 Deauville American Film Festival
Special Award, Democracy Award (Win) – 1992 Political Film Society
Tokyo Grand Prix Award (Win) – John Sayles – 1991 Tokyo International Film Festival

Awards for Matewan:
Critics Award (Nominated) – John Sayles – 1987 Deauville American Film Festival
Best Director (Nominated) – John Sayles – 1988 Independent Spirit Awards
Best Screenplay (Nominated) – John Sayles – 1988 Independent Spirit Award
Human Rights Award (Win) – 1988 Political Film Society

Awards for The Brother from Another Planet:

Best Screenplay Caixa de Catalunya Award (Win) – John Sayles – 1984 Catalan International Film Festival, Sitges, Spain
Grand Jury Prize – Dramatic (Nominated) – John Sayles – 1985 USA Film Festival (later became the Sundance Film Festival)

Awards for Return of the Secaucus 7:
Best Independent Film (Win) – 1981 Boston Society of Film Critics Awards
Best Screenplay (Win) – John Sayles – 1980 Los Angeles Film Critics Association Awards
National Film Registry – 1997 Library of Congress, National Film Preservation Board
Best Comedy Written Directly for the Screen (Nominated) – John Sayles – 1981 Writers Guild of America
Best Screenplay (Nominated) – John Sayles – 1980 New York Film Critics Circle
Second Place – 1981 US Film Festival (later became the Sundance Film Festival)

Other recognition
Sayles's first published story, "I-80 Nebraska", won an O. Henry Award; his novel, Union Dues, was nominated for a National Book Award as well as the National Book Critics Circle Award.

In 1983, Sayles received the John D. MacArthur Award, given to 20 Americans in diverse fields each year for their innovative work. He has also been the recipient of the Eugene V. Debs Award, the John Steinbeck Award and the John Cassavetes Award. He was honored with the Ian McLellan Hunter Award for Lifetime Achievement by the Writers Guild of America (1999).

Recurring collaborators
Actors who have regularly worked with Sayles include Maggie Renzi, David Strathairn, Joe Morton, Chris Cooper, Mary McDonnell, Vincent Spano, Kevin Tighe, Josh Mostel, Tom Wright, Gordon Clapp and Angela Bassett.

See also
Night Skies – for a more complete history of how the proposed Close Encounters of the Third Kind sequel became the E.T. the Extra-Terrestrial story

Further reading
Diane Carson and Heidi Kenaga, eds., Sayles Talk: New Perspectives on Independent Filmmaker John Sayles, Wayne State University Press, 2006
John Sayles, Thinking in Pictures: The Making of the Movie Matewan, Da Capo Press, 2003

References

External links

Senses of Cinema: Great Directors Critical Database
Interview April 2007 by Cathy Pryor in the London Independent
The Rumpus interview
Return of the Independent: Sayles on Sayles (5-part interview)  from siffblog.com

1950 births
Actors from Schenectady, New York
American male screenwriters
American people of Irish descent
Edgar Award winners
Living people
MacArthur Fellows
Williams College alumni
Writers from Schenectady, New York
Film directors from New York (state)
Screenwriters from New York (state)